The Vermont Medical Society is the professional organization for physicians in the U.S. state of Vermont. Founded in 1813, the organization provides service to physicians in the form of information, and lobbies the Vermont General Assembly on regulatory issues affecting its membership.

External links
Website of the Vermont Medical Society

Organizations based in Vermont
American Medical Association
1813 establishments in Vermont
Organizations established in 1813